Pershing is an unincorporated community and census-designated place (CDP) in Osage County, Oklahoma, United States. It was first listed as a CDP prior to the 2020 census.

In the other direction, Highway 11 leads west and north  to Pawhuska, the Osage county seat.

Demographics

References 

Census-designated places in Osage County, Oklahoma
Census-designated places in Oklahoma